S-adenosyl-L-homocysteine hydrolase (AdoHcyase) is an enzyme of the activated methyl cycle, responsible for the reversible hydration of S-adenosyl-L-homocysteine into adenosine and homocysteine.

AdoHcyase is a ubiquitous enzyme which binds and requires NAD+ as a cofactor. AdoHcyase is a highly conserved protein of about 430 to 470 amino acids. The family contains a glycine-rich region in the central part of AdoHcyase; a region thought to be involved in NAD-binding.

AdoHcyase is significantly associated with adenosine deaminase deficiency, which classically manifests in severe combine immunodeficiency (SCID). Accumulated adenosine derivatives, dATPs, irreversibly bind to and inhibit AdoHcyase, promoting the buildup of S-adenosyl-L-homocystine (due to equilibrium constant favors S-adenosyl-L-homocystine), a potent inhibitor of methyl transfer reactions.

This protein may use the morpheein model of allosteric regulation.

References

EC 3.3.1